Golo was a department of France from 1793 to 1811.  It was located in the northern and eastern parts of the island of Corsica.  The capital was Bastia. The department was named after the river Golo.

Golo was created in 1793 by the division of the former department of Corse, which covered the whole island. Corse was reconstituted in 1811 by re-merging Golo with Liamone.

Until 1976, Corsica was only divided into one department. Corsica was split into two departments in 1976: Corse-du-Sud and Haute-Corse.

See also
 Former departments of France

Former departments of France in Corsica
States and territories established in 1793
States and territories disestablished in 1811
1793 establishments in France
1811 disestablishments in France